The anointings of Jesus’s head or feet are events recorded in the four gospels. The account in Matthew 26, Mark 14, and John 12 takes place on the Holy Wednesday of Holy Week at the house of Simon the Leper in Bethany, a village in Judaea on the southeastern slope of the Mount of Olives.
In Matthew and Mark, he is anointed by an unnamed woman. In John, the woman is identified as Mary of Bethany, the sister of Martha and Lazarus. The event in Luke features an unknown sinful woman, and is in the northern region, as Luke 7 indicates Jesus was ministering in the northern regions of Nain and Capernaum. The honorific anointing with perfume is an action frequently mentioned in other literature from the time; however, using long hair to dry Jesus's feet, as in John and Luke, is not recorded elsewhere, and should be regarded as an exceptional gesture. Considerable debate has discussed the identity of the woman, the location, timing, and the message.

Gospel accounts
The event (or events – see discussion below) is reported in Matthew 26, Mark 14, Luke 7, and John 12. Matthew and Mark are very similar:

While Jesus was in Bethany in the home of Simon the Leper, a woman came to him with an alabaster jar of very expensive perfume, which she poured on his head as he was reclining at the table. When the disciples saw this, they were indignant. "Why this waste?" they asked. "This perfume could have been sold at a high price and the money given to the poor."  Aware of this, Jesus said to them, "Why are you bothering this woman? She has done a beautiful thing to me. The poor you will always have with you, but you will not always have me. When she poured this perfume on my body, she did it to prepare me for burial.  Truly I tell you, wherever this gospel is preached throughout the world, what she has done will also be told, in memory of her."

While he was in Bethany, reclining at the table in the home of Simon the Leper, a woman came with an alabaster jar of very expensive perfume, made of pure nard. She broke the jar and poured the perfume on his head.  Some of those present were saying indignantly to one another, "Why this waste of perfume?  It could have been sold for more than a year's wages and the money given to the poor." And they rebuked her harshly. "Leave her alone," said Jesus. "Why are you bothering her? She has done a beautiful thing to me.  The poor you will always have with you, and you can help them any time you want. But you will not always have me. She did what she could. She poured perfume on my body beforehand to prepare for my burial. Truly I tell you, wherever the gospel is preached throughout the world, what she has done will also be told, in memory of her."

When one of the Pharisees invited Jesus to have dinner with him, he went to the Pharisee's house and reclined at the table. A woman in that town who lived a sinful life learned that Jesus was eating at the Pharisee's house, so she came there with an alabaster jar of perfume. As she stood behind him at his feet weeping, she began to wet his feet with her tears. Then she wiped them with her hair, kissed them and poured perfume on them. When the Pharisee who had invited him saw this, he said to himself, "If this man were a prophet, he would know who is touching him and what kind of woman she is—that she is a sinner."  Jesus answered him, "Simon, I have something to tell you."  "Tell me, teacher," he said.  "Two people owed money to a certain moneylender. One owed him five hundred denarii, and the other fifty. Neither of them had the money to pay him back, so he forgave the debts of both. Now which of them will love him more?"  Simon replied, "I suppose the one who had the bigger debt forgiven."  "You have judged correctly," Jesus said.  Then he turned toward the woman and said to Simon, "Do you see this woman? I came into your house. You did not give me any water for my feet, but she wet my feet with her tears and wiped them with her hair. You did not give me a kiss, but this woman, from the time I entered, has not stopped kissing my feet.  You did not put oil on my head, but she has poured perfume on my feet.  Therefore, I tell you, her many sins have been forgiven—as her great love has shown. But whoever has been forgiven little loves little."  Then Jesus said to her, "Your sins are forgiven."   The other guests began to say among themselves, "Who is this who even forgives sins?"  Jesus said to the woman, "Your faith has saved you; go in peace."

Six days before the Passover, Jesus came to Bethany, where Lazarus lived, whom Jesus had raised from the dead. Here a dinner was given in Jesus' honor. Martha served, while Lazarus was among those reclining at the table with him.  Then Mary took about a pint of pure nard, an expensive perfume; she poured it on Jesus' feet and wiped his feet with her hair. And the house was filled with the fragrance of the perfume.  But one of his disciples, Judas Iscariot, who was later to betray him, objected, "Why wasn't this perfume sold and the money given to the poor? It was worth a year's wages."  He did not say this because he cared about the poor but because he was a thief; as keeper of the money bag, he used to help himself to what was put into it.  "Leave her alone," Jesus replied. "It was intended that she should save this perfume for the day of my burial. You will always have the poor among you, but you will not always have me."

Description

Location

Mark, Matthew, and John all place the incident in Bethany, a village in Judea. Mark and Matthew specify that it occurred at the home of Simon the Leper. Luke 7:36 states that Jesus had been invited to dinner at the home of Simon the Pharisee. Luke 7:39 makes clear that the sinful woman was living in the town/city (Greek: ἐν τῇ πόλει, en têi pólei) Jesus was staying in; the preceding narrative of the Raising of the son of the widow of Nain (7:11–17) makes clear that this polis (translated in English as 'town' or 'city') was Nain. Luke 7:11–17 labels Nain a polis three times, in verses 7:11 and 7:12. On the other hand, the unnamed place where Mary and Martha live in Luke 10:38–42 is labelled a 'village' (Greek: κώμη, kómé) in verse 10:38. Luke therefore linguistically connects the sinful woman to the (larger) town/city of Nain, and distinguishes the unnamed place of Mary and Martha as a (smaller) village. Since Luke 7's sinful woman lived in Nain, Luke 10's Mary lived in a village somewhere else in Galilee, and John 11–12's Mary lived in Bethany, Judea, most modern scholars agree they are three different characters, and there is no reason to assume that the sinful woman was named 'Mary' as well. Finally, the hosts receiving Jesus at their house seem to be four different characters across the stories: Simon the Leper in Mark and Matthew, Simon the Pharisee in Luke 7, Martha in Luke 10, and Lazarus of Bethany in John 11–12.

Mary of Bethany 

The account in Matthew 26, Mark 14, and John 12 has as its location the city of Bethany. In John's gospel the woman is named as Mary the sister of Martha and Lazarus. Criticism surrounding the action is directed at Mary for using an expensive ointment which could have been sold and the proceeds given to the poor. In the Matthew/Mark/John accounts, Jesus links the anointing with a preparation for his burial as he would be crucified not many days hence.

The sinful woman 

The woman in John is Mary the sister of Martha and Lazarus. In Mark and Matthew she is unnamed. The event in Luke features an unknown sinful woman. It takes place in the northern region, as Luke 7 indicates Jesus was ministering in the northern regions of Nain and Capernaum. The woman uses her tears, as well as perfume. Criticism in this account is directed at Jesus for allowing a sinner to touch him. In Luke, Jesus connects the action with the woman’s sins, his forgiveness, and the lack of hospitality of his host.

Conflation 

As with many events in the Gospels, ambiguous or missing details between the authors' accounts lead to different interpretations by readers and scholars. The accounts are generally considered to be independent events, though often been conflated—a result being the assumption that Mary is a prostitute. This is furthered by the presence of a number of women named Mary in the New Testament, leading to Mary of Bethany being interpreted as Mary Magdalene.
The rationale behind two events stems from the details in each account. All four have a setting in a house for a meal, a woman, and expensive perfume poured on Jesus to which someone objects. However, the geographic location is not identified as Bethany in Luke's account. The home in Matthew and Mark is of Simon the Leper, while in Luke it is a house of a Pharisee named Simon. John identifies Mary of Bethany and Luke "a woman in that town who lived a sinful life"—which has usually been taken to mean a prostitute—while Matthew and Mark just say "a woman". The place of anointment also differs, with Mark and Matthew stating that it was over the head, with John and Luke recording an anointing of feet and wiping with hair.
The central message of the stories in Matthew, Mark, and John is very similar with some minor differences such as "The poor you will always have with you" and "She poured perfume on my body beforehand to prepare for my burial". These are not in Luke, who instead records comments on hospitality and forgiveness of sins that are not in the other accounts.

Debate

John and Luke differ from Matthew and Mark by relating that the anointing is to the feet rather than the head. This, some argue, points to the idea that Luke is speaking of an entirely different event. J.K. Elliott says that, "It is generally agreed among scholars that all four accounts relate to the same episode." He explains the variations as the result of all four evangelists adapting the account to their own "...theological, and dramatic purpose...", using the oral and written traditions to convey their "...own apologetic aims".

Luke's gospel speaks of Jesus' feet being anointed by a woman who had been sinful all her life and who was crying; and when her tears started landing on the feet of Jesus, she wiped his feet with her hair. Also unique to Luke's version is the inclusion of the Parable of the Two Debtors in the middle of the event. An argument can be made that this story could not have occurred only a few days before the crucifixion, due to the numerous events that followed in Luke's gospel.  names her Mary, and the text assumes her to be Mary, a sister to Lazarus, as it also identifies her sister Martha. The iconography of the woman's act has traditionally been associated with Mary Magdalene, but there is no biblical text identifying her as such (she is mentioned by name for the first time, immediately following this episode, at the beginning of Luke chapter 8).

Another debate is over the implications of "the poor you always have with you"; some criticized this response as lax morality, others have responded that, due to his impending crucifixion, Jesus is simply explaining that what was done was not a choice between two moral acts, but a necessity, and would no more be criticized in Jesus' day as a modern man purchasing a coffin for a loved one, even though there are poor that could be fed instead. In the autobiographical Palm Sunday, author Kurt Vonnegut reports being invited to preach on Palm Sunday in 1980, and chooses for his text the Gospel of John's version of the anointing.  Vonnegut did so because he had "seen so much un-Christian impatience with the poor encouraged by the quotation"; he questioned the translation, saying that it lacked the mercifulness of the Sermon on the Mount, and took the opportunity to offer his own translation.

The Scholars Version note to Mark 14:3–9 states: "The disciples miss the point, which Jesus makes clear: the woman has signaled his impending death and burial. It must be unintentional irony when Mark has Jesus predict that this story will always be told in memory of a woman whose very name escapes him."

In art

See also

 Foot washing
 Chrism
 Life of Jesus in the New Testament

References

Notes

Citations

Works cited

General references

 Brown, Raymond E. An Introduction to the New Testament Doubleday 1997 
 Brown, Raymond E. et al. The New Jerome Biblical Commentary Prentice Hall 1990 
 Kilgallen, John J. A Brief Commentary on the Gospel of Mark Paulist Press 1989 
 Mack, Burton L. & Vernon K. Robbins  Patterns of Persuasion in the Gospels Wipf & Stock 2008, pp. 85–106, 
 Miller, Robert J. Editor The Complete Gospels Polebridge Press 1994 

Passion of Jesus
Gestures of respect
Women in the New Testament
Christian messianism